Marko Vujatović (Sremska Kamenica, 1775 – Sremski Karlovci, 1825) was a Serbian engraver and master woodcarver in the late Baroque style.

The iconostases of the Serbian Orthodox churches in Grgurevci, Fenek Monastery, Vrdnik, Jazak Monastery, Surčin, Bačka Palanka, Sremski Karlovci, Sremska Mitrovica and Bukovac (sr) are all attributed to Vujatović's ornamental craftsmanship. The church of St. John the Baptist in Bačka Palanka was carved between 1809 and 1814, that is, during the time of the First Serbian Uprising.

See also
 Arsenije and Aksentije Marković

References 

Serbian engravers
Serbian woodcarvers
1775 births
1825 deaths